Gitman Bros is a men's shirt and necktie manufacturer. It is one of the few remaining made in America clothing companies.

History
Based in Ashland, Pennsylvania, the original Gitman Bros was founded in 1978, with a history going back to 1932 as the Ashland Shirt & Pajama Co.

Current status
Gitman Vintage was launched in 2008. Currently owned by  Individualized Apparel Group, Gitman Bros is sold in 30 countries. 

Owing to rising costs and an insufficient volume of orders exacerbated by Covid Gitman ceased production in June 2020. Individualized Gitman's parent combined manufacture with affiliate manufacturing companies located in Tennessee and New Jersey. In September 2020 Brigade Industries a federal clothing contractor announced its intention to reopen the former Gitman Ashland operations as a contract facility.

References

See also
Alden Shoe Company
Horween Leather Company
Cone Mills Corporation

Shirts
Clothing brands of the United States
1978 establishments in the United States